Bernard Moffatt (born April 1946) is a Manx nationalist who was born in Peel, Isle of Man. Both his mother (Millie Cashin) and father (James Moffatt) were Manx. He was educated at Peel Clothworkers School, where Manx dancing classes at the School were organised by Mona Douglas, an icon of the Manx cultural revival. Moffatt was enrolled in one of those teams.

In his youth Moffatt came to know several significant figures (all from the west of the island) on the Manx nationalist and language scene (the brothers Walter and Leslie Quirk, Jack Irving and Alfie Cooil), although at that time there was no official Nationalist Party.

Bernard Moffatt was a founder member of Mec Vannin, the Manx Nationalist Party. His attendance at the inaugural meeting with a dozen other people is recorded in the original minute book of Mec Vannin, which (having inexplicably disappeared for twenty years) is now lodged with other Mec Vannin papers in the Manx Museum  (MNH) Library.

Moffatt was initially enthusiastically involved in what was then a national movement which saw itself more in a national liberation mold. The island was at that time seen by some as too heavily dominated by the United Kingdom with what they regarded as a colonial administration. There were competing schools of thought on the direction nationalism should take – these included constitutional, direct action and greater commitment to language and culture. There were even attempts to forge links with Welsh and Irish republicans, although at this time, and for over twenty years thereafter, Mec Vannin was not a republican party. The party was periodically beset by crisis and splits, something which was to continue until the mid-1980s.

Bernard Moffatt's involvement in Mec Vannin ebbed and flowed over the next ten years, and it was not until the early 1970s that he committed himself totally to the nationalist movement.

In 1976 he helped found the Anti-Militarist Alliance, an aggregation of members from the Manx branch of the Celtic League and Mec Vannin. The AMA was initially formed to campaign against British military use of the Isle of Man, and it called for the closure of an army base and military bombing range. The AMA also campaigned to end the use of military facilities on the Island to support the war in Ireland. It produced the Celtic League and AMA News, a complete set of which is held in the Manx Museum (MNH) Library.

Membership of the AMA however soon became inimical to some elements of Mec Vannin, and there were attempts to expel Moffatt and others. The expulsion attempts failed, and disenchanted elements left Mec Vannin to establish a short-lived "Manx National Party".

Moffatt continued in Mec Vannin, occupying several executive positions over the years, and was eventually elected Life President.

Celtic League
Moffatt's initial involvement with the Celtic League came in the mid-1970s as a result of the formation in Manning of the AMA. Patricia Bridson (later to become Carn Editor) was the branch secretary at the time. Moffatt eventually succeeded Bridson as Secretary and was later elected Assistant General Secretary to assist Alan Heusaff in overall stewardship of the League. Moffatt eventually succeeded Heusaff as General Secretary and undertook that office from 1984 to 1988 and 1991 to 2006.

During his period as both AGS and General Secretary, Moffatt oversaw the Celtic League's military monitoring campaigns. This was a long-running and diverse campaign covering all facets of military activity in the Celtic countries. It was extensively documented in Carn and a copious file of activities was accumulated.

These files were eventually deposited in the Manx Museum (MNH) Library (additional papers are also lodged in the National Library of Wales) and in November 2008 were featured in a French TV documentary (broadcast globally on TV5 Monde and also on France 3). Moffatt was interviewed by journalist Veronica Weber in the library vault at MNH with the boxes of files.

Military monitoring materials compiled by the League have been drawn on extensively by other sources over the years. A copy of a file on munitions dumping around the British Isles was supplied to the Department of the Marine in the 1990s, and the League's archive was also used in a report compiled for the Japanese parliament.

In addition, League material was supplied to the reopened Irish government enquiry into the 1968 Aer Lingus airliner tragedy over the Irish sea (in which British military involvement was suspected), and League queries were responded to in the final report.

Another Celtic League campaign in which Moffatt enthusiastically participated was the initiative to have the Calf of Man (a small island to the south of Man) returned from the English National Trust to the Manx nation. This collaborative venture between the Manx and London branches of the Celtic League was ultimately successful.

Moffatt has travelled extensively for the Celtic League, giving papers on nationalism, anti-militarism and civil liberties in the Celtic countries, Switzerland, Romania and Libya.

Trade unionist

Writing in the "Outside Left" column in Isle of Man Newspapers, which he wrote for briefly, in December 2015, Mr. Moffatt, pointed out the misapprehension of many regarding his politics, stating that a secretary in the 1980s Isle of Man TGWU (Transport and General Workers' Union) said (of his application to be a TGWU official),  "It’s your politics. You’re a nationalist they will definitely appoint someone from the (Manx) Labor Party. You’re not left-wing.", and added, "I remember being mildly amused at the idea that anyone in the MLP (Manx Labour Party) was left wing." He went on, "In some ways I’m a conservative with a small c."

Moffatt was an active trade unionist from the 1960s. He joined the TGWU while working for the Forestry Board and was a shop steward in the building industry in the early 1970s. He left the TGWU and joined the health union COHSE (Confederation of Health Service Employees) for a period in the mid-1970s, finally rejoining the TGWU in 1980.

Moffatt became branch chairman of the main TGWU branch (the 6/509) and also Chairman of the TGWU Isle of Man District Committee. Eventually he became full-time official for the TGWU on the island. He was involved in fuel oil disputes and brewery strikes, and also coordinated support for striking miners by blocking imports of coal into the island and raising funds.

Through the Trades Council, Moffatt cooperated with others in opposing new trade union laws. In a foreword to On Whose Terms – The Betrayal of the Manx working class he wrote:

Moffatt retired as TGWU full-time official but continued as a member of the IOM Trades Council and also as Secretary of the IOM Whitley Council for several years. He retired completely from Trade Union duties in September 2014. His daughter Angela Moffatt is a full-time official on the IOM for the white-collar and technical union "Prospect".

Civil liberties
Bernard Moffatt has been active in campaigning for reform of laws relating to civil liberties on the island for four decades. In the 1980s, with the assistance of the TGWU and when District Chairman on the island, he lobbied the Home Office, meeting government ministers and urging action to allow the right of individual petition under the European Convention on Human Rights to Manx citizens (this was rescinded in 1976 and not restored until the 1990s).

He has also campaigned for the abolition of capital punishment and judicial corporal punishment (birching), for reform of laws outlawing homosexuality, and for prison reform.

He was a founder member (and Secretary) with other trade unionists of the Manx Council for Civil Liberty which existed in the 1990s and was successful in seeing changes to civil liberties legislation which reformed all the aforementioned issues.

Moffatt was scathing of the Manx government and popular attitudes in the island to civil liberties. Quoting a remark made by a sentencing magistrate, he said:

He went on:

Moffatt has presented evidence on behalf of the Celtic League to various international bodies on civil liberties issues. In relation to the Isle of Man this has successfully focused on prison reform.

References

External links
IoM Trade Council Criticises Discriminatory Work Permit Rules
Website of the Celtic League
Celtic League news archive, majority of articles by Bernard Moffatt
New opposition to Sellafield pollution

1946 births
Living people
Manx nationalists
Manx independence activists
Mec Vannin politicians
Trade unionists